Zoophagus is a genus of zygomycete fungi that preys on rotifers and nematodes. It was established in 1911 by Sommerstorff, who originally considered it to be an oomycete.  It is common in a variety of freshwater habitats, such as ponds and sewage treatment plants.

Morphology
The mycelium is composed of non-septate hyphae that bear lateral adhesive pegs. Spores are sometimes septate long, fusiform merosporangia with tapered ends that are borne on lateral sporangiophores.

Ecology
Zoophagus species have been reported from ponds, brooks, and fens, usually in association with algae or decaying plant matter. Exceptions are Z. cornus, which was described from rice paddy mud, and Z. pectosporus, which was described from moss and additionally reported from leaf litter. Zoophagus insidians in particular has also been reported from sewage treatment plants where it can pose a significant threat to water quality. Zoophagus spp. prey on a variety of rotifer species. Zoophagus pectosporus primarily preys on nematodes and seems to be restricted to species of Bunonema, though it is also capable of trapping rotifers. When prey encounter one of the traps, an adhesive is released and the animal is caught. Hyphae later grow into the body and digest it.

Species
Zoophagus insidians Sommerstorff – type species
Zoophagus cornus Glockling 
Zoophagus pectosporus (Dreschler) M.W. Dick 
Zoophagus tentaclum Karling
Zoophagus tylopagus Xing Y. Liu & K.Q. Zhang

References

Zygomycota genera
Zygomycota